WWBL is a 50,000 watt FM radio station licensed to the city of Washington, Indiana.  The station broadcasts the Real Country format from ABC Radio Networks. WWBL is branded as The Bullet 106.5.

WWBL signed on in 1948.

Current on-air staff
Weekdays (Mon-Fri)

"Cowboy" Ken Booth (Morning Pickup) 5:00am–10:00am

Katie Sullivan 10:00am–3:00pm

Mark Brochin (Sports)

John Szink (Local News)

Other programs
Earl Pitts American commentaries (twice during the Morning Pickup weekdays and a best of Earl Pitts on Saturday)
Fox News Radio (at the top of each hour from 5:00am to 9:00am)

References

External links
WWBL Website
Original Company Website

WBL
Country radio stations in the United States